Roch Bolduc  (born September 10, 1928) is a former Canadian civil servant and Senator from the province of Quebec.

Born in Saint-Raphaël, Quebec, he received a Bachelor of Arts degree in 1948 and a Doctorate of Law degree in 1951 from Université Laval.

He was summoned to the Senate in 1988 on the advice of Prime Minister Brian Mulroney and represented the senatorial division of Gulf, Quebec. He sat as a Progressive Conservative and retired in 2003. In 1984, he was made an Officer of the Order of Canada. In 1998, he was made a Knight of the National Order of Quebec.

Personal life
He married Gisèle Lacroix in 1954. They have four children: Louise, Jacques, Richard and André. In fall 2012, he published his memoirs, Le Mandarin de l'ombre.

References
 
 
 

1928 births
Living people
Canadian civil servants
Canadian senators from Quebec
Knights of the National Order of Quebec
Officers of the Order of Canada
People from Chaudière-Appalaches
Progressive Conservative Party of Canada senators
Université Laval alumni
21st-century Canadian politicians